Thomas Dennis may refer to:

Thomas Dennis (priest) (1869–1917), Anglican priest
Thomas Dennis Company LLC
Thomas Denys (c. 1477–1561), MP for Devon
Tom Dennis (snooker player) (1882–1940), snooker and billiards player
Tom Dennis (rugby league), rugby league footballer of the 1930s